Mjedena Glava is a mountain in the municipality of Gacko, Republika Srpska, Bosnia and Herzegovina.

See also
List of mountains in Bosnia and Herzegovina

References

Mountains of Republika Srpska